The Wairau by-election 1858 was a by-election held in the  electorate during the 2nd New Zealand Parliament, on 21 May 1858. The by-election was caused by the resignation of incumbent MP William Wells and was won unopposed by Frederick Weld.

References

Wairau 1858
1858 elections in New Zealand
May 1858 events